Eschede is a former Samtgemeinde ("collective municipality") in the district of Celle, in Lower Saxony, Germany. Its seat was in Eschede. It was disbanded on 1 January 2014.

The Samtgemeinde Eschede consisted of the following municipalities:

 Eschede
 Habighorst 
 Höfer 
 Scharnhorst

Former Samtgemeinden in Lower Saxony
Celle (district)